Cavatelli (also  , ; literally "little hollows") are small pasta shells made from semolina or other flour dough, that resemble miniature hot dog buns, commonly cooked with garlic and broccoli or rapini broccoli rabe, or simply with tomato sauce. A variant adds ricotta cheese to the dough mix. Another variant with seafood is very popular in seaside cities and villages.

Regional names and varieties
Many varieties and local names of cavatelli exist, including orecchie di prete (priest's ears). In Apulia a number of varieties of cavatelli have specific names including pizzicarieddi.
A particular variety of cavatelli is typical of the area of Teggiano in Campania, where they are referred to as parmatieddi (or palmatielli). Parmatieddi are larger than cavatelli and flat-shaped. They are obtained by rolling a stick dough with three fingers of one hand, instead of with a single finger as done for the common cavatelli. Parmatieddi are usually served as a first course on Palm Sunday because their shape, similar to that of a tree leaf, recalls that of a palm.

See also
List of pasta

Notes

References

Types of pasta